Indoreonectes keralensis is a species of ray-finned fish in the genus Indoreonectes. This small stone loach is endemic to streams in the Western Ghats of India.

References

Nemacheilidae
Fish described in 1978
Taxa named by Teodor T. Nalbant